George Griffiths (11 April 1865 – 7 July 1918) was a Welsh amateur footballer who played for Chirk as an inside left. He was capped by Wales at international level.

Personal life 
Griffiths worked as a miner and had eight children. He also served in the Royal Welch Fusiliers. Griffiths served in the Army Service Corps during the First World War and was discharged in 1917 after an injury to his knee. He died of stomach cancer in July 1918.

References

1865 births
1918 deaths
People from Chirk
Sportspeople from Wrexham County Borough
Welsh footballers
Wales international footballers
Chirk AAA F.C. players
Association football inside forwards
Royal Welch Fusiliers soldiers
Royal Army Service Corps soldiers
British Army personnel of World War I
Welsh miners
Deaths from stomach cancer
Deaths from cancer in England